Peace or Love is the fourth studio album by Norwegian indie folk-pop duo Kings of Convenience. Released on 18 June 2021, it is their first album in 12 years. It features two song collaborations with Canadian musician Feist. It was preceded by two singles: "Rocky Trail" and "Fever".

Background and release
Kings of Convenience released their third studio album Declaration of Dependence in 2009 which reached number four on the US Billboard 200 chart and was met with generally favourable reviews. In April 2021, the duo, which consists of Erlend Øye and Eirik Glambek Bøe, announced the release of their fourth studio album titled Peace or Love. "Rocky Trail" was released as the lead single on 30 April 2021, alongside the album's announcement. "Fever" was served as the second single on 28 May. The album was released on 18 June by EMI Records. Their first album in 12 years, Peace or Love was recorded by the duo five times.

Music 
The melody and arrangement of "Catholic Country" was "jammed out" with The Staves at the first PEOPLE Festival.

Critical reception 

Peace or Love received positive reviews from music critics. At Metacritic, which assigns a weighted average rating out of 100 to reviews from mainstream publications, this release received an average score of 76 based on 10 reviews, indicating "generally favourable reviews". At AnyDecentMusic?, which collates album reviews from websites, magazines and newspapers, they gave the release a 7 out of 10, based on a critical consensus of 13 reviews.

In a 9/10 review, Tom Pinnock of Uncut called it their most cohesive album to date, writing that the band "seem to have discovered the purest essence of the music they create." Reviewing for The Guardian, Ben Beaumont-Thomas praised the duo's vocal chemistry as well as the album's acoustic arrangement and emotional narrative, calling it "a beautifully simple return". Similarly, Eric Mason from Slant Magazine commended the record for retaining the duo's "distinctly tranquil guitar-centric sound" and favoured the presence of bossa nova. Pitchfork writer Linnie Greene described the album as "an especially airbrushed take on easy-listening pop".

Track listing

Personnel 
Credits adapted from the album's liner notes and Tidal.

Musicians 
 Eirik Glambek Bøe – vocals , nylon-string acoustic guitar , piano , drums 
 Erlend Øye – vocals , steel-string acoustic guitar 
 Feist – vocals 
 Davide Bertolini – upright bass , viola da gamba 
 Alexander Grieg – bowed upright bass 
 Tobias Hett – viola 
 Alexander von Mehren – bass , marimba , keyboards

Technical 
 Kings of Convenience – production , mixing 
 Erlend Øye – programming , recording 
 Davide Bertolini – production , mixing , recording , upright bass 
 Kalle Gustafsson Jerneholm – production , mixing , recording 
 Cristian Heyne – production , recording 
 Robert Jønnum – production , mixing , recording 
 Antonio Pulli – production , mixing , recording 
 Phil Weinrobe – production , recording 
 Fernando Herrera Bastidas – mixing , recording 
 Jørgen Træen – mastering 
 Norman Nitzsche – mastering 
 Sascha Steinfurth – guitar technician

Artwork 
 Glauco Canalis – front cover photograph, jacket photograph, label photograph
 Salvo Alibrio – gatefold spread photograph, tiny blurry photograph
 Andrea Moschella – graphic design

Other 
 Sascha Steinfurth – consultant
 Øystein Bruvik – album title

Charts

References 

2021 albums
Kings of Convenience albums
EMI Records albums